The 1962 NAIA World Series was the sixth annual tournament hosted by the National Association of Intercollegiate Athletics to determine the national champion of baseball among its member colleges and universities in the United States and Canada.

The tournament was played at Phil Welch Stadium in St. Joseph, Missouri.

Georgia Southern (21-8) defeated Portland State (25-12) in the championship series, 2–0, to win the Eagles' first NAIA World Series.

Lewis third baseman, and future two-time World Series champion with the St. Louis Cardinals, Ed Spiezio was named tournament MVP.

Bracket

See also
 1962 NCAA University Division baseball tournament

Reference

NAIA World Series
NAIA World Series
NAIA World Series